The Cambodian Premier League is the highest professional football division in Cambodia and operates on a system of promotion and relegation with Cambodian League 2. Starting with the 2022 season, the Cambodian Premier League is contested by 8 clubs and administered by the Cambodian Football League Company (CFLC).

History

Origins
The first domestic football national championship in Cambodia was first established in 1982 during the People's Republic of Kampuchea years. The competing clubs were primarily based on the Soviet model of official amateur teams formed by ministries, the police, army and other state owned enterprises. 

In the 2000s, the Cambodian League or C-League was brought about and was rebranded as the Metfone Cambodian League or Metfone C-League at the start of the 2005 season, courtesy of corporate sponsorship of the league’s name. Over the course of the following years, the standard of professionalism would change with clubs being formed and clubs being sponsored by corporate entities. In 2018, it was announced that all clubs participating in the league would be required to have access to their own stadium before the start of the 2019 season. This was an attempt by the Football Federation of Cambodia to help further modernize football in Cambodia. In past seasons, many of the league’s clubs have shared the Phnom Penh Olympic Stadium or the Old Stadium. Since its inception as an official professional league in 2005, a total of 36 clubs have competed. 6 clubs have been crowned champions, with Phnom Penh Crown winning the title a record 8 times.

Cambodian Premier League
In October 2021, Satoshi Saito, the former international marketer for FC Barcelona of La Liga, was announced as the CEO of the Cambodian Football League Company (CFLC) which would take over the Metfone C-League's administrative and financial duties and establish the league as Cambodian Premier League starting with the 2022 season.

The Cambodia Classic Match
The Cambodia Classic Match is given to the rivalry between Phnom Penh Crown and Boeung Ket. On February 6, 2012, both teams met for the first time.

First invincible
Boeung Ket won the 2020 league season by head-to-head record against 2019 league season champion, Preah Khan Reach Svay Rieng, despite remaining unbeaten the whole season, setting up a record in the Cambodian League.

Sponsorship

The 2022 Cambodian Premier League does not have a title sponsor; however, it is sponsored by a group of multinational corporations.

The current tournament is sponsored by:

 Panasonic
 Suzuki
 Molten Corporation
 Metfone
 JACCS (Japan Consumer Credit Service)

2022 season and clubs

Notable clubs who have competed in the past

Championship history

1982–2004 Cambodian League

 1982: Ministry of Commerce
 1983: Ministry of Commerce
 1984: Ministry of Commerce
 1985: Ministry of Defense
 1986: Ministry of Defense
 1987: Ministry of Health
 1988: Kampong Cham
 1989: Ministry of Transports
 1990: Ministry of Transports
 1991: Dept. of Municipal Constructions
 1992: Dept. of Municipal Constructions
 1993: Ministry of Defense

 1994: Civil Aviation
 1995: Civil Aviation
 1996: Body Guards Club
 1997: Body Guards Club
 1998: Royal Dolphins
 1999: Royal Dolphins
 2000: National Police Commissary
 2001: Not played
 2002: Samart United
 2003: Not played
 2004: Not played

2005–2021 Metfone Cambodian League or Metfone C-League

2022–present Cambodian Premier League

Championships by club

Awards

Prize money

Coach of the season

Top scorer of the season

Player of the season

Goalkeeper of the season

Statistics

AFC Club Ranking

The following data indicates Cambodian coefficient rankings between Asian football leagues.

Country ranking
AFC League Ranking as of 2022:
 30.  (30)  Chinese Taipei Football Association (4.886)
 31.  (31)  Myanmar Football Federation (3.351)
 32.  (32)  Oman Football Association (3.001)
 33.  (33)  Football Federation of Cambodia (2.094)
 34.  (34)  All Nepal Football Association (2.025)
 35.  (35)  Football Sri Lanka (1.152)

Club ranking
AFC Club Ranking as of 2022:

References

External links
 FFC, Football Federation of Cambodia
 
 Reference , Reference

 
1
Football
Sports leagues established in 1982
Top level football leagues in Asia
1982 establishments in Cambodia